Johann David Wadephul (born 10 February 1963, in Husum) is a German politician of the Christian Democratic Union (CDU) who has been a member of the German Parliament since 2009.

Education 
Wadephul completed high school at Meldorfer Gelehrtenschule. Afterwards he studied law in Kiel and became a lawyer specializing in health care law and social law.

Political career

Career in state politics
Wadephul joined the CDU party in 1982.

From 1993, Wadephul was a member of the leadership of the CDU in Schleswig-Holstein. He served as Secretary General of the CDU in the state from 1997 to 2000, under the leadership of party chairman Peter Kurt Würzbach. From 2000 until 2002, he briefly chaired the party in Schleswig-Holstein, but was soon succeeded by Peter Harry Carstensen. During his time as chairman, he publicly endorsed Edmund Stoiber as the party’s candidate to challenge incumbent Chancellor Gerhard Schröder in the 2002 federal elections.

Following the 2000 state elections, Wadephul also became a Member of the Landtag of Schleswig-Holstein, where he succeeded Carstensen as chairman of the CDU parliamentary group when the party won the 2005 elections. He did not run for re-election in 2009.

Member of the German Bundestag, 2009–present
Wadephul has been a Member of the German Bundestag since the 2009 elections, representing the Rendsburg-Eckernförde district.

Wadephul first served on the Committee on Labour and Social Affairs. From the 2013 elections, he was the chairman of the Committee on the Scrutiny of Elections, Immunity and the Rules of Procedure. In addition, he served as member of the Committee on Foreign Affairs and of the parliament’s Council of Elders, which – among other duties – determines daily legislative agenda items and assigning committee chairpersons based on party representation.

On the Committee on Foreign Affairs, Wadephul was his parliamentary group’s rapporteur on relations with the Middle East, Arab states of the Persian Gulf and Iran. He also covered issues related to Belarus, Ukraine, Russia and the Western Balkans. In addition to his committee assignments, he served as Deputy Chairman of the German-Belarusian Parliamentary Friendship Group.

In the negotiations to form a coalition government under the leadership of Chancellor Angela Merkel following the 2017 federal elections, Wadephul was part of the working group on foreign policy, led by Ursula von der Leyen, Gerd Müller and Sigmar Gabriel. He has since been serving as deputy chairman of the CDU/CSU parliamentary group under the leadership of Volker Kauder; in this capacity, he succeeded Franz Josef Jung.

In addition to his work in parliament, Wadephul has been a member of the German delegation to the Parliamentary Assembly of the Council of Europe (PACE) since 2010. As member of the CDU, he is part of the Group of the European People's Party. Since joining the Assembly, he has served on various committees, including Committee on Legal Affairs and Human Rights, the Committee on Rules of Procedure, Immunities and Institutional Affairs and the Sub-Committee on Ethics. Since 2022, he has also been a member of the German delegation to the NATO Parliamentary Assembly, where he is part of the Political Committee.

For the 2021 elections, Wadephul was elected to lead the CDU campaign in Schleswig-Holstein for the fourth consecutive time.

Other activities
 European Council on Foreign Relations (ECFR), Member
 German-Arab Friendship Association (DAFG), Member of the Board
 Norddeutscher Rundfunk, Member of the Broadcasting Board
 Hermann Ehlers Foundation, Deputy Chairman of the Board
 Petersburger Dialog, Member of the Board

Political positions
In June 2017, Wadephul voted against his parliamentary group’s majority and in favor of Germany’s introduction of same-sex marriage.

In 2019, Wadephul joined 14 members of his parliamentary group who, in an open letter, called for the party to rally around Merkel and party chairwoman Annegret Kramp-Karrenbauer against criticism voiced by conservatives Friedrich Merz and Roland Koch.

In April 2020, Wadephul co-signed – alongside around 50 other members of his parliamentary group – a letter to President of the European Commission Ursula von der Leyen which called on the European Union to take in children who were living in migrant camps across Greece.

Ahead of the Christian Democrats’ leadership election in 2021, Wadephul publicly endorsed Norbert Röttgen to succeed Annegret Kramp-Karrenbauer as the party’s chair.

Personal life
Wadephul is married and has three children. The family lives in Molfsee.

References

External links
 Website of Johann David Wadephul
 Johann David Wadephul at the Landtag of Schleswig-Holstein

1963 births
Living people
Members of the Bundestag for Schleswig-Holstein
Members of the Landtag of Schleswig-Holstein
People from Husum
Members of the Bundestag 2021–2025
Members of the Bundestag 2017–2021
Members of the Bundestag 2013–2017
Members of the Bundestag 2009–2013
Members of the Bundestag for the Christian Democratic Union of Germany